Leuchar Burn is a stream that rises in the Loch of Skene, in Aberdeenshire, Scotland  Initially near the headwaters Leuchar Burn flows in a southerly course; as it approaches the Royal Deeside, the watercourse rotates to the southeast, ultimately forming a boundary between Aberdeenshire and Aberdeen City.  The stream then veers southerly once again before merging to the Culter Burn, which joins the River Dee at the village of Peterculter.

See also
Durris Castle
Normandykes

References

Rivers of Aberdeenshire